North Washington is an unincorporated community in Butler County, Pennsylvania, United States. North Washington has a post office with ZIP code 16048.

References

Unincorporated communities in Butler County, Pennsylvania
Unincorporated communities in Pennsylvania